The Nauru national rugby sevens team made its international debut at the 2015 Pacific Games in Port Moresby, Papua New Guinea.

History
Nauru was introduced to the sport of Rugby sevens in 2012. They became an associate member of the Federation of Oceania Rugby Unions in 2014.

Nauru won their first international game at the 2016 Oceania Sevens Championship, defeating the Solomon Islands 22-19.

Competing in the 2017 Pacific Mini Games, Nauru defeated Vanuatu 24-12, and Wallis and Futuna 31-10, their largest win ever.

Current squad
Squad to the 2015 Pacific Games:
Sherlock Denuga
Zac Temaki
Turner Peter Thoma
Rassmusen Dowabobo
Vito Denuga
Kristides Menke
Charles Dagiaro
Chamrock Agir
Kingstone Ika
Damon Adeang
Geronimo Ivan Daniel
Cazaly Jeremiah

References

S
Rugby union in Nauru
National rugby sevens teams
Rugby clubs established in 2012
2012 establishments in Nauru